Rude Awakenings, a New Zealand comedy-drama television series,  aired on TV One on Friday evenings. The first episode aired on 9 February 2007. By March it was averaging almost 320,000 viewers. 
It has been confirmed there will be no more episodes, with TVNZ citing low ratings as the reason despite the show receiving much praise from viewers.

The series centres on two families who live next door to each other in a fashionable street in Ponsonby, a suburb of Auckland. The Rush family has just moved to their newly renovated house in Ponsonby from a lifestyle block in Kumeu. Dimity, the mother, is a human resources manager; Stuart, the father, is an anaesthetist, and Julian and Ollie are their sons. They immediately hit a wrong chord with their new neighbours, the Short family.

Arthur Short has recently had his wife Sharon leave him for a lesbian relationship, and he is unemployed and with few prospects. His two teenage daughters, Amber and Constance, live with him. Their house, where they have been tenants for the last 20 years, is up for sale, but they are determined to remain where they are.

The series was recently released to DVD.

Cast and characters
Danielle Cormack as Dimity Rush
Carl Bland as Stuart Rush
Jaxin Hall as Julian Rush
Mark Davies as Ollie Rush
Patrick Wilson as Arthur Short
Hannah Tasker-Poland as Amber Short
Rose McIver as Constance Short
Marise Wipani as Sharon Short
William Walker as Ralph Gubb
Fiona Samuel as Bonnie Buckley
David Mackie as Jase Buckley
Hera Dunleavy as Dara
Peter Feeney as Spencer Fantl
Michael Lawrence as Michael "Horse" Grieve
Gene Hollins-Werry as Max Buckley

References

External links
M F Films website
TVNZ website
EPisodeWorld: Rude Awakenings episode guide

2000s New Zealand television series
2007 New Zealand television series debuts
2007 New Zealand television series endings
English-language television shows
New Zealand comedy-drama television series
Television shows filmed in New Zealand
Television shows set in Auckland
TVNZ 1 original programming